Neoculladia is a genus of moths of the family Crambidae.

Species
Neoculladia incanelloides Bleszynski, 1967
Neoculladia incanellus (Zeller, 1877)
Neoculladia subincanella Bleszynski, 1967

References

Natural History Museum Lepidoptera genus database

Crambini
Crambidae genera
Taxa named by Stanisław Błeszyński